Discrete manufacturing is the production of distinct items. Automobiles, furniture, toys, smartphones, and aeroplanes are examples of discrete manufacturing products.  The resulting products are easily identifiable and differ greatly from process manufacturing where the products are undifferentiated, for example oil, natural gas and salt.

Discrete manufacturing is often characterized by individual or separate unit production.  Units can be produced in low volume with very high complexity or high volumes of low complexity.  Low volume/high complexity production results in the need for a flexible manufacturing system that can improve quality and time-to-market speed while cutting costs. High volume/low complexity production puts high premiums on inventory controls, lead times and reducing or limiting materials costs and waste.

Industry Profile - Discrete Manufacturing includes makers of consumer electronics, computer and accessories, appliances, and other household items, as well as "big ticket” consumer and commercial goods like cars and aeroplanes. Discrete Manufacturing companies make physical products that go directly to businesses and consumers, and assemblies that are used by other manufacturers. 

The processes deployed in discrete manufacturing are not continuous in nature. Each process can be individually started or stopped and can be run at varying production rates. The final product may be produced out of single or multiple inputs. Producing a steel structure will need only one type of raw material - steel. Producing a mobile phone requires many different inputs. The plastic case, LCD display, the mainboard, PVC keypad, sockets, cables are made from different materials, at different places. This is different from Process manufacturing like production of paper or petroleum refining, where the end product is obtained by a continuous process or a set of continuous processes.

Production capacity of the factory as a whole in discrete manufacturing is impossible to calculate. It is the question of common sense that how can one calculate the production capacity of its multiple characterize different products because the production time and machine setups of the parts produced are different from each other.

Some discrete manufacturing vertical markets 
 Industrial Manufacturing
 High Tech
 Automotive
 Aerospace and Defense
 Machinery
 Electronics

References

Electronics manufacturing